Hátszeghy is a Hungarian surname. Notable people with the surname include:

 Ottó Hátszeghy (1902–1977), Hungarian fencer
 József Hátszeghy (1904–1988), Hungarian fencer, brother of Ottó

Hungarian-language surnames